Irving Middle School could be referring to the following:

Washington Irving Middle School (Los Angeles) - Los Angeles, California
Irving Middle School Nebraska - Lincoln, Nebraska
Washington Irving Middle School (Springfield) - Springfield, Virginia